The  is a type of 4-6-2 steam locomotive built in Japan in 1931 and designed by Hideo Shima and built by Kisha Seizō and Kawasaki Heavy Industries Rolling Stock Company . A total of 17 were built in 1931 the locomotives were numbered C54 1-C54 17 . All were retired by 1963 after 32 years of service they were scrapped later that year . None of the C54’s were preserved.

Preserved examples
No Class C54 locomotives have been preserved.

See also
 Japan Railways locomotive numbering and classification
JNR Class C53
JNR Class C55

References

Further reading
 

1067 mm gauge locomotives of Japan
Steam locomotives of Japan
4-6-2 locomotives
Railway locomotives introduced in 1931
Passenger locomotives